The 1906 Hillsdale Dales football team represented Hillsdale College in the 1906 college football season.

Schedule

References

Hillsdale
Hillsdale Chargers football seasons
Hillsdale Dales football